Marvel is a census-designated place (CDP) and post office on the Southern Ute Indian Reservation in southwestern La Plata County, Colorado, United States. The CDP is a part of the Durango, CO Micropolitan Statistical Area. The Marvel post office has the ZIP Code 81329 (post office boxes).

History
The Marvel area was homesteaded in the late-1800s and early-1900s with ranching, farming, and oil extraction being the main economic drivers in the region.

Geography
The area around Marvel is very dry and the region becomes more and more arid as one travels towards the New Mexico border and further away from the La Plata mountains. While the town lies within the Reservation, the land within and around the town is owned by private landowners and the reservation proper only starts several miles to the South and East of Marvel.

Demographics

See also

 List of census-designated places in Colorado

References

External links

 Southern Ute Indian Tribe website
 La Plata County website

Census-designated places in La Plata County, Colorado
Census-designated places in Colorado